Siraj Ahmed Yusuf Saleh Al-Tall (born 8 January 1982 in the United Arab Emirates) is a retired Jordanian footballer who last played for Pelita Jaya.

Career 
Al-Tall joined the Jordanian League side Al-Faisaly as a teenager in 1999 and has been playing for them until 2008, when he joined Sydney Olympic, in the Australian NSW Premier League. Initially he was not given clearance by the Jordan FA to play for his new club, as they claimed that he had an outstanding contract with his previous club. Siraj maintained that no such contract existed. Sydney Olympic went to FIFA to resolve the situation, and FIFA ruled in favour of Sydney Olympic on 1 May 2008. In 2009, he joined Pelita Jaya in the top flight of Indonesian football, Indonesian Super League.

International career 
He was a member of the Jordan national football team. The forward earned ten caps for Jordan and scored four goals. The last time he featured for his country was against Kyrgyzstan in October 2007.

International goals

References

External links
 
 
 Siraj Al-Tall Interview

1982 births
Living people
Sydney Olympic FC players
Jordanian footballers
Jordan international footballers
Jordanian expatriate footballers
Association football forwards
Expatriate soccer players in Australia
Expatriate footballers in Indonesia
Liga 1 (Indonesia) players
Pelita Bandung Raya players
Al-Faisaly SC players
2004 AFC Asian Cup players